Welcome to Reality is the second album by American singer-songwriter Ross Copperman, and first on a major label. The singles released from the album were "As I Choke", "All She Wrote", and "Found You". Released in May 2007, the album reached the charts in Scotland and the United Kingdom.

Critical reception
Allmusic's Sharon Mawer remarked that the album's commercial prospects suffered as the label appeared to favor "their reality TV produced singers than with a genuine rock singer/songwriter, especially one who sounded so much like many other major stars." In a negative review, Dave Simpson of The Guardian wrote that the album consisted of "lowest-common-denominator songs could have been put together in a laboratory." Nick Mitchell of The Skinny said that when listening to the songs on the album as a whole, "they all become one and the same: sickly, insipid twaddle that couldn't be fixed by all the session guitarists in the world."

Track listing 
All She Wrote
Found You
Guilty Pleasure
Fly Away
As I Choke
I Get By
Can’t Stop Loving You
Believe
I Don’t Wanna Let You Go
Lucky Day
Get Away
Shout
They’ll Never Know
To Be (Hidden Track)

Charts

References

External links
 

2007 albums